Danbury Historic District is a national historic district located at Danbury, Stokes County, North Carolina. The district encompasses 44 contributing buildings in the central business district and surrounding residential section of Danbury.  They were built between about 1860 and 1930 and include notable examples of Queen Anne, Romanesque Revival, and Bungalow architecture.  Located in the district and separately listed is the Stokes County Courthouse.  Other notable buildings include the County Jail (1904), Petree Store, the Martin Store, Stack-Bickett Law office (1888), Bank of Stokes County (c. 1910), McCannless Hotel (c. 1860s), James Pepper House (c. 1860), Wilson Fulton brick house (c. 1860), Samuel H. Taylor House/Hotel, the N. E. Wall House (c. 1921), Baptist Mission Church, Clark Memorial Presbyterian Church (c. 1893), and the Methodist Church.

It was added to the National Register of Historic Places in 1986.

References

Historic districts on the National Register of Historic Places in North Carolina
Queen Anne architecture in North Carolina
Romanesque Revival architecture in North Carolina
Buildings and structures in Stokes County, North Carolina
National Register of Historic Places in Stokes County, North Carolina